The Cemetery of the Evergreens, also called The Evergreens Cemetery, is a non-denominational rural cemetery along the Cemetery Belt in Brooklyn and Queens, New York. It was incorporated in 1849, not long after the passage of New York's Rural Cemetery Act spurred development of cemeteries outside Manhattan. For a time, it was the busiest cemetery in New York City; in 1929 there were 4,673 interments.  Today, the Evergreens is the final resting place of more than 526,000 people.

It features several thousand trees and flowering shrubs in a park-like setting. Cypress Hills Cemetery lies to its northeast.

History
The Evergreens was built on the principle of the rural cemetery. Two of the era's most noted landscape architects, Andrew Jackson Downing and Alexander Jackson Davis, were instrumental in the layout of the cemetery grounds.

The Evergreens has a monument to six victims of the Triangle Shirtwaist Factory fire of March 25, 1911 who were unidentified for nearly a century.  In 2011, Michael Hirsch, a historian, completed four years of research that identified these victims by name (see ).

There are also seventeen British Commonwealth service personnel buried in the cemetery: thirteen from World War I and four from World War II.

The cemetery was listed on the National Register of Historic Places on November 15, 2007.

Notable burials

Individual graves

 John Bunny (1863–1915), actor
 George C. Bennett (1824–1885), newspaper publisher and New York State assemblyman
 Albert Levi Burt (1843–1913), eponymous founder of the publisher A. L. Burt.
 Anthony Comstock (1844–1915), censor (see Comstock Law)
 William C. Cooper (1853–1918), silent-film actor
 Bill Dahlen (1870–1950), Major League Baseball player, one of the outstanding early 20th century players. Lies in an unmarked grave.
 James E. Davis (1962–2003), New York City councilman (he was originally interred in Green-Wood Cemetery, but after it was realized that his assassin was also interred there, he was moved to the Cemetery of the Evergreens)
 Thomas Dilward (1842–1887), Minstrel performer credited with having invented the word "hunky-dory"
 George Henry Ellis (1875–1898), A chief yeoman on the USS Brooklyn
 Alice Fleming Day (1882–1952), actress, stage and screen
 Effie Germon (1845–1914), Stage actress descended from the Germons of Baltimore, an old theatrical family
 John D. Germon (1840–1901), Stage actor descended from the Germons of Baltimore, an old theatrical family; brother of Effie Germon
 Adelaide Hall (1901–1993), singer, actress, dancer, nightclub chanteuse
 George Hall (1849–1923), Major League Baseball player, banned from baseball for life
 Yusef Hawkins (1973–1989), murder victim
 Martin Johnson Heade (1819–1904), artist
 Lucille Hegamin (1894–1970), singer, female pioneer of the Blues
 William Hickey (1927–1997), actor
 Martin Hildebrandt (1825–1890), early tattoo artist
 Fanny Janauschek (1829–1904), Czech-born stage actress
 Joseph Forsyth Johnson (1840–1906), landscape architect and great-grandfather of Bruce Forsyth
 Walt Kelly (1913–1973), cartoonist
 George H. Lindsay (1837–1916), congressman
 George W. Lindsay (1865–1938), congressman, his son
 Winsor McCay (1872–1934), cartoonist and animated cartoon pioneer
 Antonio "Tony" Pastor (1837–1908), vaudevillian
 Charles A. Read (1837–1865), American Civil War Medal of Honor recipient
 Julia Smitten Reinhardt (1844–1924), stage actress and suffragist
 Sante Righini (1883–1912), died on the Titanic
 Bill "Bojangles" Robinson (1878–1949), tap dancer
 Stephen A. Rudd (1874–1936), congressman
 Assotto Saint (1947–1994), poet, publisher and performance artist
 Joseph Thuma Schenck (c. 1891–1930), vaudevillian, better known as "Joe" Schenck, of the comedy singing team Van and Schenck
 William Steinitz (1836–1900), world chess champion
 Bob Thiele (1922–1996), record producer
 Amy Vanderbilt (1908–1974), journalist, etiquette authority
 Oscar Walker (1854–1889), Major League Baseball player
 John William Warde (c. 1912–1938), his widely publicized suicide inspired the movie Fourteen Hours.
 Horace Weston (1825–1890), banjo player
 Thomas "Blind Tom" Wiggins (1849–1908), musician
 Lester Young (1909–1959), jazz musician

Group monument
 Triangle Shirtwaist fire – the bodies of six victims of the 1911 fire to be identified were buried under a monument of a kneeling woman.  They could not be identified after the inferno because they were burned beyond recognition, and had been buried without names.  A century after the tragedy, in 2011, they were identified by historian Michael Hirsch as Maria Giuseppa Lauletti, Max Florin, Concetta Prestifilippo, Josephine Cammarata, Dora Evans, and Fannie Rosen.

See also
 List of United States cemeteries

References

Further reading
 Rousmaniere, John. Green Oasis in Brooklyn: The Evergreens Cemetery 1849–2008. (2008)

External links

 The Evergreens Cemetery official home page
 

Cemeteries on the National Register of Historic Places in New York City
1849 establishments in New York (state)
Buildings and structures completed in 1849
Cemeteries in Brooklyn
Cemeteries in Queens, New York
Triangle Shirtwaist Factory fire
Bushwick, Brooklyn
Actors Fund of America
National Register of Historic Places in Brooklyn
Rural cemeteries
Cemeteries established in the 1840s